Hypercompe albescens is a moth of the family Erebidae first described by George Hampson in 1901. It is found in Guatemala.

Larvae have been recorded feeding on Musa species.

References

albescens
Moths described in 1901